The cedi (currency sign: GH₵; currency code: GHS) is the unit of currency of Ghana. It is the fourth historical and only current legal tender in the Republic of Ghana. One cedi is divided into one hundred pesewas (Gp).

After independence, Ghana separated itself from the British West African pound, which was the currency of the British colonies in the region. The new republic's first independent currency was the Ghanaian pound (1958–1965).  In 1965, Ghana decided to leave the British colonial monetary system and adopt the widely accepted decimal system. The African name Cedi (1965–1967) was introduced in place of the old British pound system. Ghana's first President Dr. Kwame Nkrumah introduced Cedi notes and Pesewa coins in July 1965 to replace the Ghanaian pounds, shillings and pence. The cedi bore the portrait of the President and was equivalent to eight shillings and four pence (8s 4d), i.e. one hundred old pence, so that 1 pesewa was equal to one penny.

After the February 1966 military coup, the new leaders wanted to remove the face of Nkrumah from the banknotes. The "new cedi" (1967–2007) was worth 1.2 cedis, which made it equal to half of a pound sterling (or ten shillings sterling) at its introduction. Decades of high inflation devalued the new cedi, so that in 2007 the largest of the "new cedi" banknotes, the 20,000 note, had a value of about US$2. The new cedi was gradually phased out in 2007 in favor of the "Ghana cedi" at an exchange rate of 1:10,000. By removing four digits, the Ghana cedi became the highest-denominated currency unit issued in Africa. It has since lost over 90% of its value.

Etymology 

The word cedi is the Akan word for cowry shell. Cowries (plural of cowry) were formerly used as currency in what is now Ghana. The Monetaria moneta or money cowry is not native to West African waters but is a common species in the Indian Ocean. The porcelain-like shells came to West Africa, beginning in the 14th century, through trade with Arab merchants. The first modern coins exclusively used at the Gold Coast were produced in 1796 but cowries were used alongside coins and gold dust as currency until 1901.

History

First cedi, 1965–1967 

The first cedi was introduced in 1965, replacing the pound at a rate of 2.4 cedi = 1 pound, or 1 pesewa = 1 penny. The first cedi was pegged to sterling at a rate of 2.4 cedis = 1 pound or 8s 4d per cedi.

Second cedi (GHC), 1967–2007 

The first cedi was replaced in 1967 by a "new cedi" which was worth 1.2 first cedis. This allowed a decimal conversion with the pound, namely 2 second cedis = 1 pound. The change also provided an opportunity to remove Kwame Nkrumah's image from coins and notes.

The second cedi was initially pegged to sterling at a rate of ₵2 = £1 stg. However, within months, the second cedi was devalued to a rate of ₵2.45 = £1 stg, less than the initial value of the first cedi. This rate was equivalent to ₵1 = 0.98 U.S. dollars and the rate to the dollar was maintained when sterling was devalued in November 1967. Further pegs were set of $0.55 in 1971, $0.78 in 1972, and $0.8696 in 1973 before the currency was floated in 1978. High inflation ensued, and so the cedi was re-pegged at ₵2.80 = $1.00.

The cedi's value continued to be eaten away on the black market. In the early 1980s, the government started cracking down hard on the retail of products at prices other than the official established sale price (also known as price controls). This had the effect of driving nearly all commerce underground, where black market prices for commodities were the norm, and nothing existed on store shelves. By 1983 the cedi was worth about 120 to one U.S. dollar on the black market, a pack of cigarettes cost about ₵150 (if they could be found), but the bank rate continued at ₵2.80 = $1.00. Finally, with foreign currency completely drying up for all import transactions, the government was forced to begin a process of gradual devaluation, and a liberalization of its strict price controls. This process ended in 1990 with a free float of the cedi against foreign currencies. Inflation continued (see the exchange rate chart) until by July 2007, one US dollar was worth about ₵9500, and a transition to the third cedi was initiated.

In 1979 a currency confiscation took place. New banknotes were issued which were exchanged for old ones at a rate of 10 old notes for 7 new ones. Coins and bank accounts were unaffected.

A second confiscation took place in 1982, when the ₵50 note (the highest denomination) was demonetized. Ghanaians, in theory, could exchange any number of ₵50 notes for coins or other banknotes without loss, but foreigners could not make any exchange. However, many Ghanaians who were hoarding large amounts of cedis feared reprisal if they tried to convert all of it, and so simply burned a lot of their money. Many other Ghanaians received "promise payment notes" from the banks, but never received compensation. This confiscation was publicly justified as a means to create a disincentive for the flourishing black market. However, from a monetary perspective, currency confiscations have the effect of reducing the available cash in the economy, and thereby slowing the rate of inflation. After the ₵50 note confiscation, the ₵20 note was the highest cedi denomination, but had a street value of only about $0.35 (U.S.)

After the ₵50 note confiscation, fears existed that the government could also confiscate the ₵20 or even the ₵10 notes. This fear, along with inflation running at about 100% annually, started causing Ghanaians to lose their faith in their country's own currency. Some transactions could only then be done in foreign currencies (although that was technically illegal), and other, more routine transactions began to revert to barter.

In 1991, 10, 20, 50, and 100 cedi coins were introduced, followed by 200 and 500 cedis in 1996. These six denominations were still in circulation until 2007. However, the 10 cedis (~0.1 U.S. cents) and 20 cedis (~0.2 U.S. cents) coins were not seen much due to their small value.

Third cedi (GHS), 2007–present 

Because of the rampant inflation in the decades before the exchange the second cedi was only worth a small fraction of its original value. The government decided to "cut" four zeros off the currency by switching to the third cedi. The new currency was not introduced as the third cedi but is instead officially called the "Ghanaian cedi" (GH₵), in contrast to the second cedi that was officially known as the "new cedi". In the second half of 2007 both the second and third cedi were legal tender as the old currency was being gradually withdrawn. At the end of December 2007, more than 90% of all old coins and notes had been withdrawn. From January 2008 old banknotes could only be exchanged at banks and were no longer legal tender.

On 14 May 2010, a GH₵2 banknote was issued to meet public need for an intermediate denomination and reduce the frequency, and associated cost, of printing large volumes of the GH₵1 banknote. The introduction of the new denomination coincided with the conclusion of the year-long centenary celebrations of the birth of Kwame Nkrumah, Ghana's first president, and has the commemorative text "Centenary of the Birth of Dr. Kwame Nkrumah".

Due to periods of "sustained high inflation" and "perennial depreciation of the currency", the Bank of Ghana on 29 November 2019, announced the issuance of a new 2-cedi coin and as well as new 100 and 200-cedi banknotes. Existing 1 and 2 cedi banknotes remain legal tender, though these denominations will be gradually replaced by coins to reduce costs.

The third Cedi has been losing value continuously since it was introduced. In 2014, the inflation rose rapidly as the value of the third cedi fell to a fourth of its original value. The devaluation was temporarily halted in the last quarter of 2014 as the currency stabilized due to a pending IMF bailout of Ghana.

Due to its negligible purchasing power, the one pesewa coin is rarely seen in circulation. In September 2021, the Bank of Ghana began the process of withdrawing GH₵1 and GH₵2 notes from circulation to encourage the use of coins of their corresponding face values.

In August 2022, accelerating inflation and continued economic mismanagement has caused the cedi's value to drop to 10 U.S. cents (GH₵10 = US$1). , the annual inflation rate of 37.2% as reported by the Ghana Statistical Service was the highest since 2001.

By October 2022, the cedi became the world's worst performing currency, having lost 60% of its value relative to the U.S. dollar since the end of 2021. The exchange rate  was about GH₵15 per U.S. dollar.

Coins 
The Bank of Ghana has been issuing all Ghanaian coins since 1958. Beside the coins in general circulation the bank have also issued commemorative coins These special coins have been issued in shillings (1958), crowns (1965), pounds (1958–1977), sikas (1997–2003) and cedis (2013-). It is unclear if the Bank of Ghana considered commemorative crowns and sikas together with  the commemorative pounds that were coined after 1965 as legal tender or simply as medallions.

Only coins that have been or are in general circulation are included in this list. The years of issue does not indicated that the series have been coined every year in the period but that the coin has been issued more than once in the stated period. Some coins are held back and released years after they are issued. This means that in the general circulation there are worn out coins and coins in mint condition from the same issuing year. The Bank of Ghana has never stated if they are simply holding back already stamped coins until they are needed or if they are stamping coins successively with old issue years.

First cedi (1965–67)

Second cedi

Third cedi 
The new coins are 1 pesewa (100 old cedi), 5 pesewas (500), 10 pesewas (1,000), 20 pesewas (2,000), 50 pesewas (5,000), 1 cedi (10,000) and 2 cedis (20,000).

Banknotes 

The Bank of Ghana has been issuing all Ghanaian banknotes since 1958. Most of the Ghanaian banknotes have been changed slightly from one year's issue to the next year's issue in the ongoing technological fight against counterfeit money. The signature on the notes also changes when a new governor takes over the management of the Bank of Ghana. Such changes are frequent and are not covered in this list. The years of issue do not indicate that the series has been printed every year in the period, but that the banknote has been issued more than once in the given period.

First cedi (1965–67)

Second cedi (1967–2007)

1967 to 1979

1979 to 2007

Third cedi (2007–present)

Exchange rate history

See also 
 Economy of Ghana
 E-Cedi
 Previous Ghanaian currencies:
Money cowry
Akan goldweights (golddust)
Gold Coast ackey
 British West African pound
 Ghanaian pound

References

External links 
 
 Original source of the above pre-2007 Ghanaian banknotes: https://www.banknotes.com/gh.htm

Currencies of the Commonwealth of Nations
Currencies of Ghana
Currency symbols
Currencies introduced in 1965
Circulating currencies